This is a list of events held and scheduled by the Titan Fighting Championships (Titan FC), a mixed martial arts organization based out of Pompano Beach, Florida.

2006 events

Titan FC 1

Titan FC 1 took place on March 11, 2006, at the Memorial Hall in Kansas City, Kansas. 

Results

Titan FC 2

Titan FC 2 took place on May 12, 2006, at the Maner Conference Center in Topeka, Kansas. 

Results

Titan FC 3

Titan FC 3 took place on May 20, 2006  in Durant, Oklahoma

Results

Titan FC 4

Titan FC 4 took place on June 9, 2006, at the Memorial Hall in Kansas City, Kansas. 

Results

Titan FC 5

Titan FC 5 took place on August 4, 2006, at the Memorial Hall in Kansas City, Kansas. 

Results

2007 events

Titan FC 6

Titan FC 6 took place on January 26, 2007, at the Memorial Hall in Kansas City, Kansas. 

Results

Titan FC 7

Titan FC 7 took place on March 23, 2007, at the Memorial Hall in Kansas City, Kansas. 

Results

Titan FC 8

Titan FC 8 took place on July 27, 2007, at the Community America Ballpark in Kansas City, Kansas. 

Results

Titan FC 9

Titan FC 9 took place on September 22, 2007, at the Memorial Hall in Kansas City, Kansas. 

Results

Titan FC 10

Titan FC 10 took place on November 28, 2007, at the Memorial Hall in Kansas City, Kansas. 

Results

2008 events

Titan FC 11

Titan FC 11 took place on March 22, 2008, at the Municipal Auditorium in Kansas City, Missouri.

Results

Titan FC 12

Titan FC 12 took place on December 19, 2008, at the Municipal Auditorium in Kansas City, Missouri. 

Results

2009 events

Titan FC 13

Titan FC 13 took place on March 13, 2009, at the Municipal Auditorium in Kansas City, Missouri.

Results

Titan FC 14

Titan FC 14 took place on October 2, 2009 at the Memorial Hall in Kansas City, Kansas.

Results

2015 events

Titan FC 34

Titan FC 34 took place on July 18, 2015 at the Scottish Rite Temple in Kansas City, Missouri.

Results

Titan FC 35

Titan FC 35 took place on September 19, 2015 at the Clark County Fairgrounds Event Center in Ridgefield, Washington.

Results

Titan FC 36

Titan FC 36 was scheduled to take place on December 18, 2015 at the Scottish Rite Temple in Kansas City, Missouri, but it was announced on December 9 that the event was cancelled due to a health issue with the current CEO of the company. 

Results

2016 events

Titan FC 37

Titan FC 37 took place on March 4, 2016 at the Clark County Civic Center in Ridgefield, Washington, USA. It had a stacked card with 3 title fights. 

Results

Titan FC 38

Titan FC 38 took place on April 30, 2016 at the Miccosukee Casino in Miami, Florida, USA.  

Results

Titan FC 39

Titan FC 39 took place on June 10, 2016 at the BankUnited Center in Coral Gables, FL, USA. 

Results

Titan FC 40

Titan FC 40 took place on August 5, 2016 at the BankUnited Center in Coral Gables, FL, USA. 

Results

Titan FC 41

Titan FC 41 took place on September 9, 2016 at the BankUnited Center in Coral Gables, FL, USA. 

Results

Titan FC 42

Titan FC 42 took place on December 2, 2016 at the Watsco Center in Coral Gables, FL, USA. 

Results

2017 events

Titan FC 43

Titan FC 43 took place on January 21, 2017 at the Watsco Center in Coral Gables, FL, USA. 

Results

Titan FC 44

Titan FC 44 took place on May 19, 2017 at the Pembroke Pines City Center in Pembroke Pines, FL, USA. 

Fight card

Titan FC 45

Titan FC 45 took place on August 18, 2017 at the Pembroke Pines City Center in Pembroke Pines, FL, USA. 

Fight card

Titan FC 46

Titan FC 46 took place on November 17, 2017 at the Pembroke Pines City Center in Pembroke Pines, FL, USA. 

Fight card

Titan FC 47

Titan FC 47 took place on December 15, 2017 at the Xtreme Action Park in Ft. Lauderdale, FL, USA. 

Fight card

2018 events

Titan FC 48

Titan FC 48 took place on February 16, 2018 at the Xtreme Action Park in Ft. Lauderdale, FL, USA. 

Fight card

Titan FC 49

Titan FC 49 took place on April 6, 2018 at the Xtreme Action Park in Ft. Lauderdale, FL, USA. 

Fight card

Titan FC 50

Titan FC 50 took place on June 29, 2018 at the Xtreme Action Park in Ft. Lauderdale, FL, USA. 

Fight card

Titan FC 51

Titan FC 51 took place on December 21, 2018 at the Almaty Arena in Almaty, Kazakhstan. 

Fight card

2019 events

Titan FC 52

Titan FC 52 took place on January 25, 2019 at the Xtreme Action Park in Ft. Lauderdale, Florida, USA. 

Fight card

Titan FC 53

Titan FC 53 took place on March 15, 2019 at the Xtreme Action Park in Ft. Lauderdale, Florida, USA. 

Fight card

Titan FC 54

Titan FC 54 took place on April 26, 2019 at the Xtreme Action Park in Ft. Lauderdale, Florida, USA. 

Fight card

External links
Official Titan FC Site
Titan FC events at Sherdog

Titan FC
Events in Kansas City, Missouri
Events in Coral Gables, Florida
Events in Fort Lauderdale, Florida
Sports in Coral Gables, Florida